Red Pajamas Records is an independent American record label. It was founded in 1982 by Chicago singer-songwriter Steve Goodman and his manager Al Bunetta. Between 1983 and his death in 1984, Goodman released two albums on Red Pajamas: Artistic Hair and Affordable Art. Two more, Santa Ana Winds and the Grammy Award-winning Unfinished Business, were released posthumously in 1984 and 1987. Red Pajamas Records operates under the management of Oh Boy Records, which is owned by Goodman's friend John Prine. Red Pajamas releases archival live performances by Goodman, compilations, and reissues of his earlier material. The label has also released three recordings of tribute performances by Goodman's friends.

Origin
Between 1971 and 1980, singer-songwriter Steve Goodman recorded first on the Buddah label, then on Asylum.  During this time he wrote and recorded such enduring songs as "City of New Orleans", a 1972 Top 20 hit for Arlo Guthrie and a 1984 #1 Hot Country Single for Willie Nelson; and "You Never Even Call Me By My Name", which was made famous by David Allan Coe in 1974.  Following the release of the album Hot Spot in 1980, his contract with Asylum ended and Goodman moved to Seal Beach, California.  Goodman had been suffering from leukemia for more than ten years, and around this time he came out of remission.  Performing was difficult and he wanted to record again, but not with a major label.  He decided to create his own label, and Red Pajamas Records was born with the assistance of Goodman's long-time manager Al Bunetta.

Early releases
For Goodman's first release on Red Pajamas, Bunetta and Dan Einstein edited a series of bootleg live performance tapes.  As Goodman's manager, Bunetta had been confiscating these tapes for years from concertgoers who didn't have permission to record Goodman's shows.  The resulting album Artistic Hair was released in 1983.  The title refers to the cover photo, which shows Goodman's chemotherapy-induced hair loss.  At first, Red Pajamas Records was a mail-order business, with Goodman and his wife Nancy receiving orders for Artistic Hair and shipping copies themselves at a rate of 5 or 6 per day.  When Goodman's condition improved he went back into the studio and recorded three more albums.  Affordable Art, with both live and studio cuts, was released in 1983, but then Goodman died in September 1984.  Santa Ana Winds was released posthumously late in 1984.  The appropriately titled Unfinished Business was released in 1987, and in 1988 it won a Grammy Award for Best Contemporary Folk Album.

Later releases
The next two Red Pajamas releases of Goodman's music were compilations drawn from the earlier Asylum material, followed by a two-disc retrospective with both live and studio cuts (No Big Surprise.)  In 1996 The Easter Tapes was released, a live album edited from a series of performances taped by DJ Vin Scelsa at New York radio station WNEW-FM in the 1970s.  The next five releases were reissues of the Asylum albums from 1975 to 1980.  In 2000, another live album of a concert from the 1980s was released (Live Wire) and critics called it a treasure.  In 2003, Red Pajamas released a video containing two of Goodman's performances on the TV program Austin City Limits from 1977 and 1982.  The video included interviews with Goodman and others.  A 2006 audio release featured Goodman in a 1978 concert at Chicago's Earl of Old Town, and included musicians Corky Siegel on harmonica, Hugh McDonald on bass, Jethro Burns on mandolin, and composer David Amram on pennywhistle and percussion.  In 2008, the label released an Extended Play CD titled The Baseball Singles containing 4 Goodman songs with baseball-themed lyrics, including "Go, Cubs, Go."  The latest release, in 2013, was Don't Blame Me, a live concert from 1973.

Tributes
Red Pajamas has produced three tributes featuring friends of Goodman, two on audio and one on video.  The first was 1986's Tribute To Steve Goodman, with Prine, Bonnie Raitt, Fred Holstein, Bonnie Koloc and others.  Next was My Old Man, compiled ten years later by Goodman's daughter Rosanna.  The album includes interpretations of Goodman's compositions by her friends Chris Brown, Kate Fenner and others, and includes Rosanna's own delivery of the title tune, which was written by her father Steve about her grandfather Bud.  The third tribute is the 2007 DVD Larger Than Life, a fundraiser for the Old Town School of Folk Music featuring Arlo Guthrie, Lyle Lovett, Jackson Browne, Emmylou Harris and John Prine.

Discography

See also
Oh Boy Records
Go, Cubs, Go
Steve Goodman
List of record labels
John Prine

References

American independent record labels
Old Town School of Folk musicians
Record labels established in 1982
1982 establishments in the United States